This list of University of South Florida alumni includes graduates, non-graduate former students and current students of the University of South Florida. There are more than 290,000 alumni of the University of South Florida.

Alumni names are alphabetized within categories.

Academics

Business

Entertainment, journalism, and literature

Government, military and international affairs

School of Information
Andrew S. Breidenbaugh, 1996, director of the Tampa-Hillsborough County Public Library System
Lucia M. Gonzalez, 1991, is  an author and library director.
 Angie Drobnic Holan, 2010, editor of PolitiFact.com

Athletics

Miscellaneous
 John E. Miller III, bishop in the Anglican Church in North America
 Debra Lafave, teacher who pled guilty to lewd or lascivious battery against a teenager
 Joybubbles, an early phone phreak who figured out how to place free long-distance phone calls by whistling the correct tone as a USF student in the 1960s.

References

 
University of South Florida